X is the final album by the fusion jazz band Tribal Tech released 26 March 2012.

Track listing
All compositions are from Tribal Tech.
 "Mech X" –  		
 "Got Faith 'N Phat" – 
 "Time Lapse" – 	
 "Anthem" – 
 "Palm Moon Plaza"  – 	
 "Gravity" – 
 "Working Blue" – 
 "Ask Me A Question" – 	
 "Let's Get Swung" – 
 "Corn Butter" –

Personnel
Musicians
Scott Henderson - guitar
Gary Willis - bass
Scott Kinsey - keyboards
Kirk Covington - drumsOther credits
 Scott Kinsey - engineer, mastering, mixing
 Bret Linford - artwork
 Tony Masterantonio - cover art
 Mr. Suzuki - spoken Word
 Steve Tavaglione - photography
 Masaki Toriawa - spoken Word

References

External links
 
 

2012 albums
Tribal Tech albums